The British Private Equity and Venture Capital Association, sometimes known simply as the British Venture Capital Association, or BVCA, is a trade organisation for the private equity and venture capital industry in the United Kingdom.  It was founded in 1983 and has more than 500 member firms, including over 230 private equity and venture capital houses, as well as institutional investors, professional advisers, service providers and international associations as members.  Michael Moore is the director general. The Chair is elected annually by the members. The organization lobbies on regulatory, tax and governmental matters that relate to private equity owned businesses in the UK.

It produces reports on, among other topics, the relative rate of return on UK private equity and venture capital funds and organises conferences. 

Sandra Robertson, chief executive of the Oxford Endowment Fund, used a BCVA conference in 2012 to criticise private equity funds’ documents for containing “pages and pages of legal jargon”. 

In 2021 it hosted a discussion on the industry’s “perception problem”.

In 2022 it announced that it planned to develop a practical guide for making climate-related financial disclosures.

References

External links
 BCVA

Business organisations based in the United Kingdom